Royal Air Force Church Fenton or RAF Church Fenton  was a former Royal Air Force (RAF) station located  south east of Tadcaster, North Yorkshire, England and  north west of Selby, North Yorkshire, near the village of Church Fenton. The station was opened in 1937 and during the Second World War was home to air defence aircraft, a role retained by the station until the 1960s when it became a training station. It closed in 2013 and is now a civilian airfield known as Leeds East Airport.

History

Prewar 
Despite the protests construction started in early 1936 on the  site, a mixture of private and West Riding County Council-owned farm land.

On 1 April 1937 the station was declared open and on 19 April the first station commander Wing Commander W.E. Swann assumed command. Within two months No. 71 Squadron RAF had arrived with the Gloster Gladiator.

Second World War 
Opened in 1937, it saw the peak of its activity during the years of the Second World War, when it served within the defence network of fighter bases of the RAF providing protection for the Leeds, Bradford, Sheffield and Humber estuary industrial regions.

During September 1940 it became home to the first RAF "Eagle squadron" of American volunteers being No. 71 Squadron RAF initially with the Brewster Buffalo I for one month before changing to the Hawker Hurricane I. The airfield was also home to both the first all-Canadian and all-Polish squadrons, with No. 242 Squadron RAF for the Canadians and No. 306 Polish Fighter Squadron for the Polish. 242 Squadron, first established in the First World War and then disbanded, was re-formed here in October 1939, using Canadian personnel.

As technologies evolved, No. 54 Operational Training Unit (54 OTU) was formed at Church Fenton in 1940, the first night fighter OTU, staying until 1942. Some of the squadrons stationed there also flew the de Havilland Mosquito.

The following squadrons were billeted at Church Fenton at various times:

Postwar 
After the war it at first retained its role as a fighter base, being among the first to receive modern jet aircraft, namely the Gloster Meteor and the Hawker Hunter. Between October 1950 and March 1957 it was the base of No. 609 Squadron RAF, within the Royal Auxiliary Air Force and named "West Riding". The unit was equipped with Gloster Meteors.

In later years, its role was mainly flight training. No. 7 Flying Training School RAF was based here between 1962 and 1966 and again between 1979 and 1992, equipped with Hunting Aircraft Jet Provost T3 trainers.

For some years it was home to the Royal Navy Elementary Flying Training School (RNEFTS) using the Scottish Aviation Bulldog, and again 1979–1992, triggered by the introduction of the Panavia Tornado, being the first station to receive the new turboprop-powered Short Tucano T.1 basic fast jet trainers. From 1998 to 2003 Church Fenton was the RAF's main Elementary Flying Training airfield.

The following squadrons were also posted here at some point:

 19, 23, 41, 72, 85.
 112, 129 (Mysore), 141.
 257 (Burma), 263 (Fellowship of the Bellows) with Meteors, 264 (Madras Presidency).

2003–2013 
On 25 March 2013 it was announced that Church Fenton would close by the end of 2013. The units would be relocated to RAF Linton-on-Ouse by 31 December 2013.

By 19 December 2013, all units had relocated and the airfield was closed. Some equipment will be relocated to RAF Topcliffe. MoD security continued to secure the site until disposal. A NOTAM was issued suspending the air traffic zone (ATZ) at the end of 2013.

The following units were here at some point:

Air Displays 
For a large part of its history RAF Church Fenton has hosted an annual air display, originally called "Empire Air Day" and later it became the annual “Battle of Britain” display. When the air display in aid of Soldier’s Sailor’s and Airmen’s Families (SSAF) discontinued at Leeds Bradford Airport it moved to RAF Church Fenton where it attracted large crowds, the largest being 63,000 in 1968. Allen Rowley, aviation correspondent at the Yorkshire Evening Post, was its principal organiser and commentator until 1989.

Yorkshire Universities Air Squadron and ATC 
The station was home to Yorkshire Universities Air Squadron and it is from there that they used to conduct their flying training in the Grob Tutor Aircraft.  Much of the station is now derelict and fenced off and the Officers Mess has been demolished.  The airside section of the station is closed with various hangars incorporating YUAS's aircraft, engineering support, fire/ambulance facilities and a sports hangar. The station used to have a fully functioning and staffed Air Traffic Control Tower.

The Station headquarters remains and used to incorporate YUAS's administration, presentation and social facilities. There was a canteen facility known as the "Feeder" and a basic accommodation block. Yorkshire UAS ceased operations at RAF Church Fenton on 19 December 2013, following the closure of the airfield.

Current use 

The airfield is now known as Leeds East Airport and is also home to 2434 (Church Fenton) Squadron Air Training Corps.  The site was sold on 23 December 2014 to Makins Yorkshire Strawberries with the exception of a section containing the Air Cadets.  In February 2015, Makins Enterprises (the new airfield owners) launched their new website, renaming the airfield. It will now be known as 'Leeds East Airport', with the slogan "Yorkshire's newest aviation destination."  It is believed that Makins Enterprises will target the business jet market, while also running a flying school and other ventures.  The second series of the ITV drama Victoria was shot at a hangar onsite in 2017.

Current operational units 

 2434 (Church Fenton) Squadron Air Training Corps

See also 

 List of former Royal Air Force stations

References

Citations

Bibliography

External links

 A brief and detailed history of RAF Church Fenton

Royal Air Force stations in Yorkshire
Buildings and structures in North Yorkshire
Airports in England
Royal Air Force stations of World War II in the United Kingdom
Military units and formations established in 1937